Mark Eli Kalderon (born 1964) is an American philosopher and Professor of Philosophy in the University College London Department of Philosophy. He is known for his expertise on philosophy of color and philosophy of perception.

Early life and education 
Kalderon was born in New York City.

He received a B.A. from the University of Michigan, Ann Arbor and a Ph.D. from Princeton University.

Career 
Kalderon has taught at University College London Department of Philosophy since 2000.

Works and publications

Books
 Moral Fictionalism, Clarendon Press 2005
 Fictionalism in Metaphysics (ed.), Clarendon Press 2005
 Form Without Matter: Empedocles and Aristotle on Color Perception, Oxford University Press 2015

References

External links
Mark Eli Kalderon at University College London Department of Philosophy
Mark Eli Kalderon at Google Scholar

21st-century American philosophers
Philosophy academics
Princeton University alumni
Living people
1964 births
Academics of University College London
University of Michigan alumni
Philosophers of mind